Chido Nwokocha is an American actor.

Early life and education 
Chido Nwokocha is a Nigerian-American who grew up in Sacramento, California.  He attended Ohio University, where he played wide receiver.  After college, he played professionally for the San Jose Sabercats of the Arena Football League. When a knee injury cut his football career short, he pursued an acting career.

Career 
Currently, Chido Nwokocha is a series regular in the BET show Sistas, written, directed and produced by Tyler Perry. Sistas was renewed for a second season and he will return as Gary Marshall Borders.  He has also appeared in a recurring role in TNT’s Murder in the First, and guested on such series as Days of Our Lives, Hawaii Five-0, Scorpion and The Night Shift. Film credits include Destroyer, The Mendoza Line, Bad Therapy and Top Gun: Maverick.

Filmography

Television

Film

References

See also 
 IMDB
 Instagram
 Apple TV+
 Spectrum News
 The Perfect Man

American actors
Year of birth missing (living people)
Living people